The 2015 BWF Super Series, officially known as the 2015 Metlife BWF Super Series for sponsorship reasons, was the ninth season of the BWF Super Series.

Schedule
Below is the schedule released by the Badminton World Federation:

Results

Winners

Performance by countries
Tabulated below are the Super Series performances based on countries. Only countries who have won a title are listed:

Finals

All England

India

Malaysia

Singapore

Australia

Indonesia

Japan

Korea

Denmark

France

China

Hong Kong

Masters Finals

References

 
BWF Super Series
Super Series Premier and Super Series